The legislative districts of Mountain Province are the representations of Mountain Province in the various national legislatures of the Philippines. The province is currently represented in the lower house of the Congress of the Philippines through its lone congressional district.

The present-day provinces of Apayao, Benguet, Ifugao and Kalinga, as well as the highly urbanized city of Baguio, formed part of the old (pre-division) Mountain Province's representation until 1969. Since 1969, the representation of Mountain Province has been confined only to the limits of the former sub-province of Bontoc.

History

As the undivided Mountain Province (1908–1966) 
Initially being excluded from representation in the lower house of the Philippine Legislature in 1907, the then non-Christian-majority areas of the Philippines — which included the undivided Mountain Province — were finally extended legislative representation with the passage of the Philippine Autonomy Act in 1916 by the United States Congress. The Revised Administrative Code (Act No. 2711) enacted on March 10, 1917, further elaborated on the manner by which these areas would be represented. The non-Christian areas were to be collectively represented in the upper house's 12th senatorial district by two senators, both appointed by the Governor-General. Three assembly members, also appointed by the Governor-General, were to represent the Mountain Province and the chartered city of Baguio in the lower house as a single at-large district. The appointment of these members of the Legislature did not require the consent of the upper house; the appointive legislators were also not necessarily required to be residents of the areas they represented. For example, Assemblyman Pedro Aunario, a resident of Manila, and Senator Lope K. Santos, a resident of Rizal, were among the representatives of the Mountain Province.

Despite several of the Mountain Province's municipalities and municipal districts being annexed to the neighboring provinces of Ilocos Sur (in 1920), La Union (in 1920) and Cagayan (in 1922 and 1928), voters in these areas were still represented by the three assembly members of the Mountain Province, and two senators of the twelfth senatorial district. Only starting in 1935 were these voters extended the right to participate in electing representatives of their respective new provinces, when Act No. 4203 assigned them to specific districts for the purposes of electing members of the unicameral National Assembly of the Philippines.

Act No. 4203 also abolished the senatorial district system and made the Mountain Province's representation to the National Assembly elective through popular vote; the law divided the province into three districts with definite territorial composition. The only sub-province which belonged to more than one district was Bontoc: the eastern portion consisting of the present-day municipalities of Barlig, Bontoc, Paracelis, Natonin, Sabangan, Sadanga and Sagada were represented as part of the undivided province's first district, while the western portion which formerly belonged to the now-defunct Lepanto sub-province (Bauko, Besao and Tadian) were represented as part of the third district.

During the Second World War, the Mountain Province sent two delegates to the National Assembly of the Japanese-sponsored Second Philippine Republic: one was the provincial governor (an ex officio member), while the other was elected through a provincial assembly of KALIBAPI members during the Japanese occupation of the Philippines. Baguio, being a chartered city, was represented separately in this short-lived legislative body. Upon the restoration of the Philippine Commonwealth in 1945, district representation was restored to the pre-war setup: the sub-province of Bontoc remained split between the first and third districts, and the independent city of Baguio remained part of the second district.

As the reduced Mountain Province (1966–present) 
The enactment of Republic Act No. 4695 on June 18, 1966 made the sub-province of Bontoc into a full-fledged province that retained the name "Mountain Province." Per Section 10 of R.A. 4695 the three incumbent representatives of pre-division Mountain Province continued to serve their respective districts until the end of the 6th Congress.

The new (post-division) Mountain Province began electing its lone representative in 1969. The province was represented as part of Region I from 1978 to 1984, and returned one representative, elected at-large, to the Regular Batasang Pambansa in 1984.

Under the new Constitution which was proclaimed on February 11, 1987, Mountain Province constituted a lone congressional district, and elected its member to the restored House of Representatives starting that same year.

Lone District 
Population (2015): 154,590

Notes

1st District (defunct) 

Sub-province of Apayao: Calanasan (Bayag), Conner, Kabugao, Luna, Namaltugan (annexed to Calanasan 1936), Tauit (annexed to Luna 1936), Pudtol (established 1959), Flora (established 1963), Santa Marcela (established 1967)
part of Sub-province of Bontoc: Barlig, Bontoc, Natonin, Sabangan, Sadanga, Sagada, Paracales (Paracelis) (established 1962)
Sub-province of Kalinga: Balbalan, Lubuagan, Pinukpuk, Tabuk, Tanudan, Tinglayan (transferred from Bontoc sub-province 1922), Liwan (established 1965), Pasil (established 1966) 

Notes

2nd District (defunct) 

City: Baguio
Sub-province of Benguet: Ampusungan (annexed to Bakun 1936), Atok, Bakun, Bokod, Buguias, Itogon, Kabayan, Kapangan, Kibungan, La Trinidad, Mankayan, Sablan, Tuba, Tublay

Notes

3rd District (defunct) 

Sub-province of Ifugao: Banaue, Lagawe (Burnay), Hungduan, Kiangan, Mayoyao, Potia (established as municipal district 1955), Lamut (established as municipal district 1959)
part of Sub-province of Bontoc (annexed from Lepanto 1920): Banaao (annexed to Kayan 1935), Bauko, Besao, Tadian (Kayan)

Notes

At-Large (defunct)

1917–1935 
 includes the independent city of Baguio, and the sub-provinces of Amburayan (abolished 1920), Apayao, Benguet, Bontoc, Ifugao, Kalinga and Lepanto (abolished 1920)
 also includes municipalities and municipal districts that had been transferred to other provinces: 
Cagayan: Allacapan (1928), Langangan (1922)
Ilocos Sur: Alilem (1920), Angaki (1920), Cervantes (1920), Concepcion (1920), San Emilio (1920), Sigay (1920), Sugpon (1920), Suyo (1920), Tagudin (1920)
La Union: Bagulin (1920), Disdis (1920), Pugo (1920), Santol (1920), San Gabriel (1920), Sudipen (1920)

Notes

1943–1944 
 includes the sub-provinces of Apayao, Benguet, Bontoc, Ifugao and Kalinga; excludes the independent city of Baguio

1984–1986

See also 
Legislative district of Benguet
Legislative district of Baguio
Legislative district of Ifugao
Legislative district of Kalinga-Apayao
Legislative district of Apayao
Legislative district of Kalinga

References 

Mountain Province
Politics of Mountain Province